Eunoe crassa is a scale worm described from off Punta Arenas, Chile in the South Pacific Ocean.

Description
Elytra 15 pairs (presumably). No distinct pigmentation pattern. Anterior margin of prostomium rounded. Lateral antennae inserted ventrally (beneath prostomium and median antenna). Notochaetae distinctly thicker than neurochaetae. Bidentate neurochaetae absent.

References

Phyllodocida
Animals described in 1924
Endemic fauna of Chile